Inamorata is the sixteenth studio album by the country rock band Poco, released in 1984. Featuring guest spots by former members Timothy B. Schmitt, Richie Furay and George Grantham (the only member missing from the classic years line up was Jim Messina), this would be the last album that the band would record for Atlantic Records. After this the original line up (Richie Furay, Rusty Young, Jim Messina, Randy Meisner and George Grantham) would reform for the 1989 release Legacy.

Reception

In his Allmusic review, music critic Rob Theakston wrote, "Armed with an armada of fresh ideas and a bright new overly chorused synthesizer, Poco all but abandons their country-rock roots in favor of a reverb heavy electronic drum kit, bright synths, and production that has not aged well. Even guest appearances by Poco alumni Timothy B. Schmit and Zappa drummer Vinnie Colaiuta can't save the group from serving up a lackluster and forgettable ten-song offering that would prove to be the group's swan song until their reunion in 1989."

Track listing
"Days Gone By" (Paul Cotton) – 3:50
"This Old Flame" (Reed Nielsen) – 3:02
"Daylight" (Rusty Young) – 3:55
"Odd Man Out" (Cotton) – 3:06
"How Many Moons" (Cotton) – 4:30
"When You Love Someone" (Young) – 4:03
"Brenda X" (Cotton) – 3:38
"Standing in the Fire" (Cotton) – 3:46
"Save a Corner of Your Heart" (Young) – 3:41
"The Storm" (Young) – 4:25

Personnel 

Poco
 Kim Bullard – keyboards
 Paul Cotton – guitars, vocals
 Rusty Young – steel guitar, guitars, vocals
 Steve Chapman – drums, percussion

Guest musicians
 Richard Gibbs – keyboards
 Randy Kerber – keyboards
 George Doering – guitars
 Neil Stubenhaus – bass
 Vinnie Colaiuta – drums, percussion
 Steve Forman – drums, percussion
 Richie Furay – vocals
 George Grantham – vocals 
 Timothy B. Schmit – vocals
 Richard Landis – rhythm track arrangements 
 Charles Calello – string arrangements

Production 
 Paul Cotton – producer 
 Rusty Young – producer 
 Joe Chiccarelli – co-producer, engineer, mixing 
 Bryan Bell – assistant engineer 
 Ann Calnan – assistant engineer 
 Csaba Petcoz – assistant engineer
 Gene Wooley – assistant engineer
 Greg Fulginiti – mastering 
 Phil Hartman – cover design 
 Stan Watts – cover illustration 

Studios
 Recorded at Conway Studios, The Sound Factory, Doering Studio and Artisan Sound Recorders (Hollywood, California); Can-Am Recorders (Tarzana, California).
 Mixed at Capitol Studios (Hollywood, California).
 Mastered at Artisan Sound Recorders.

References

Poco albums
1984 albums
Atlantic Records albums
Albums produced by Joe Chiccarelli